Galactose mutarotase (aldose 1-epimerase) (gene name GALM) is a human enzyme that converts alpha-aldose to the beta-anomer. It belongs to family of aldose epimerases.

References

External links 
 PDBe-KB provides an overview of all the structure information available in the PDB for Human Aldose 1-epimerase (Galactose mutarotase)